Sankt Willibald, officially St. Willibald (Central Bavarian: Williwoid), is a municipality in the district of Schärding in the Austrian state of Upper Austria.

Geography
Sankt Willibald lies in the Innviertel. About 28 percent of the municipality is forest, and 63 percent is farmland.

References

Cities and towns in Schärding District